Myrmecia auriventris is an Australian ant which belongs to the genus Myrmecia. This species is native to Australia and is commonly distributed in Queensland.

Worker ants are typically 18-20 millimetres long. Drones are smaller at 15.5 millimetres. The head, pronotum, gaster, and other features are a black colour, while the node, epinotum, and metanotum is red. Other features like the mandibles, antennae and tarsi are a reddish yellow, while other parts are brown.

References

External links

Myrmeciinae
Hymenoptera of Australia
Insects described in 1870
Insects of Australia